Chan Yun (October 18, 1915 - March 7, 2009) was a renowned Buddhist monk, teacher and cultivator. The abbot of the Lianyin Temple, Chan Yun was one of many mainstream Buddhist teachers in Taiwan.

Early life
Master Chan-Yun was born in 1915 at a small village in the Andong province, China, which the village near the border between Mainland China and Korea. When he was young, he had been to Japan for learning fine art.

Learning Buddhadharma
Master Chan-Yun took the refuge in the three jewels and became a Buddhist when he was 24. At the age of 26, he took the five precepts. At 30, he became a monk in Beijing. He therefore received full ordination at the Guangji Temple. Then, he had studied at Chinese Buddhist College in Beijing for four years. In 1948, he went to Fuzhou to learn the Buddha dharma from Venerable Ci-Zou.

Ferry to Taiwan
In 1949, Master Chang Yun ferried to Taiwan.
In 1956, he built a tentative house for intensive practices, and which was called “Yin-Hong Hut” at Guan-Yin Mountain in PuLi. Due to a major flood disaster in 1959, he had to abandon the Hut. Consequently, he planned to found the current Lianyin Temple with his disciple Ven. Xing-Yin in 1963.

Founding the Fast and Precept Association
Starting in 1966, Master Chan Yun founded the “Fast and Precept Association”; its motto is “the vinaya is our guide”. Then, he initiated the “Fasting and Precepts Program” at the temple, which offered intensive courses in Buddhism study and precepts practices during summer and winter vacations for college students.

Vinaya practice and legacy
Master Chan Yun disciplined himself strictly, practicing the vinaya, and made it as his daily routine to practice prostrating himself before the Buddha, practicing morning and evening rituals and executing the "Mengshan Food Bestowal ritual". Master Chang-Yun never violated eight precepts, the precept of no eating after noon, since he became a monk. According to his disciples, his teaching was compared to that of Marpa Lotsawa to Milarepa.

Nirvana
Venerable Master Chang Yun died at one o'clock on the morning of March 7, 2009 at Shuili township, Nantou county, Taiwan.

Notes

External links

蓮因寺網路全球念佛共修(Lian-Yin Template website) 
佛學多媒體資料庫 > 演講錄音 > 懺雲法師(audio files lectured by Master Chan Yun) 

1915 births
2009 deaths
Chan Buddhist monks
Taiwanese Zen Buddhists
Taiwanese people from Liaoning
20th-century Buddhist monks